Schaumburg High School, also known as SHS, is a public four-year high school located in Schaumburg, Illinois, a northwest suburb of Chicago, United States. The school is part of Township High School District 211, which also includes William Fremd High School, Hoffman Estates High School, Palatine High School, and James B. Conant High School.

History
Schaumburg High School opened on September 17, 1970, located 31 miles northwest of downtown Chicago near Woodfield. It is accredited by the North Central Association and has earned full recognition status by the State Superintendent of Schools in the State of Illinois.

SHS serves students who reside in Schaumburg, the south side of Hoffman Estates and northern Hanover Park.

In 1993 the United States Department of Education recognized Schaumburg High School as a Blue Ribbon School of Excellence. In 1996 SHS was recognized by Redbook magazine as one of "America's Best Schools." In 1999 they were one of 96 high schools nationwide recognized as an outstanding high school by U.S. News & World Report.

In late 2008, SHS underwent a massive reconstruction product in which 13 new classrooms, a new grand foyer, busport, administration center, three new science labs, and handicap accessibility were added to the high school. This was a part of the larger District 211 construction projects on Conant, Hoffman Estates, and Schaumburg High schools.

Every two years Schaumburg also donates to the St. Baldrick's Foundation. In 2012 Schaumburg raised over $100,000 giving them second place in the state of Illinois for most money raised. Most recently in 2022 they raised $71,497 for St. Baldrick's Foundation

Academics
Schaumburg High School was ranked 486 in the nation during the year 2012 by Newsweek's Best High Schools. In 2015, SHS had an average composite ACT score of 22.1, and graduated 96.5% of its senior class.

Schaumburg has been recognized as making Adequate Yearly Progress (AYP) according to the provisions of the federal No Child Left Behind Act.

Athletics and activities

Schaumburg currently has 62 clubs & activities  and 24 athletic organizations. Schaumburg High School is a member of the Mid-Suburban League. SHS is also a member of the Illinois High School Association (IHSA), which governs most interscholastic sports and activities in the state. Its mascot is Siegie Saxon and they are known as the Saxons.

Schaumburg sponsors interscholastic athletic teams for young men and women in basketball, cross country, golf, gymnastics, soccer, swimming,wrestling, & diving, tennis, track & field, volleyball, and water polo.  Young men may compete in baseball, football, while young women may compete in badminton, bowling, and softball. The school also sponsors teams for young men and women in lacrosse, though this sport is not sponsored by the IHSA.

The following teams have finished in the top four of their respective state tournament or meet.

 Baseball:  2nd place (1988–89);  State Champions (1996–97); 7th place (2005–06)
 Basketball (boys):  4th place (1998–99);  State Champions (2000–01)
 Bowling (girls):  3rd place (1973–74, 1982–83, 2006–07, 2017–18);  2nd place (1972–73, 2007–08);  State Champions (2003–04)
 Cross Country (boys):  4th place (1980–81, 1995–96);  3rd place (1992–93, 1998–99, 2006–07);  2nd place (1981–82, 1991–92, 1999–2000);  State Champions (1985–86, 1987–88, 1988–89)
 Cross Country (girls):  4th place (1984–85, 2002–03);  2nd place (1986–87, 1991–92);  State Champions (1982–83, 1999–2000, 2010–11)
 Debate (Congressional):  State Champions (2015, 2016, 2017)
 Debate (Lincoln-Douglas):  State Champions (2012, 2022), 2nd Place (2014, 2015, 2021)
 Debate (Public Forum):  State Champions (2014), 2nd Place (2013)
 Field Hockey (girls):  State Champions (1977–78) -- discontinued by the IHSA
 Football:  2nd place (1999–2000)
 Gymnastics (girls): 3rd place (2010–11)
 Ice Hockey (boys) : State Runner Up (1987)
 Soccer (girls):  4th place (1988–89, 1991–92);  3rd place (1990–91);  State Champions (1992–93)
 Poms: 1st place (2008)(2011)
 Flags: 1st place in lyrical flag, tall flag, and State Grand Champions (2009–10), 1st place in lyrical flag, 3rd in tall flag, and State Grand Champions (2010–11)
 Business Professionals of America: State Champion in Interview Skills (2004–2005). State finalists in four events (2013–2014).

Notable alumni

Reshma Saujani, CEO of Girls Who Code and author of Brave Not Perfect, graduated SHS in 1993.
Chris Mueller (soccer) is an American professional soccer player who for plays for Orlando City SC in Major League Soccer.
Alexandra Billings is the first transgender woman to play a transgender character on television.
 Susan Downey (née Levin) is a film producer; she was 1991 valedictorian at SHS and is married to actor Robert Downey, Jr.
 Nadia Geller (née MacNider) is an interior designer, known for television shows such as While You Were Out, Trading Spaces, and Home Made Simple.
 Paul Justin is a former NFL quarterback (1995–2001) who played for Arizona State University. 
 Kurt Kittner is a former NFL quarterback for the Atlanta Falcons (2002–03) who played for the University of Illinois.
  Hamid Mehreioskouei is a former professional footballer for the Chicago Fire Soccer Club
 Erin Merryn is a sexual-abuse education activist and lobbyist for Erin's Law, now passed in 37 states and pending in 13 more. People Magazine named her one of fifteen women changing the world. US Senator Gillibrand passed federal version of Erin’s Law in 2015 federally funding it. 
 Markos Moulitsas is founder and primary author of the Daily Kos political blog.
Dr. Christopher J. Schneider is a professor of sociology at Wilfrid Laurier University, known for research and publications on social media and crime.
Shane Madej, co-host of Buzzfeed Unsolved and co-founder of Watcher Entertainment.
Mike Carden, guitarist of rock band The Academy Is....

References

External links
 Official website
 District Website
 Official website of Schaumburg's newspaper, the Saxon scribe

Schaumburg, Illinois
Public high schools in Cook County, Illinois
Educational institutions established in 1970
1970 establishments in Illinois